Eric Charles Handyside (3 November 1881 – 1 April 1926) was a British policeman who served as Officiating Commandant of the North West Frontier Police in what is today Pakistan.  Handyside received several commendations for his service there. 

Handyside was born in St. Petersburg, Russia, a son of James Andrew Handyside, a Scottish merchant resident there, and his wife, the former Jessie McIntosh.  His sister, Muriel Handyside, would go on to found a library in Baghdad that would become one of the only public libraries in the country in the 1920s. 

Handyside joined the Indian Police Service in Punjab in 1901 as an Assistant Superintendent, and was promoted to Superintendent in 1909. In 1913, he transferred to the North West Frontier Police and, in 1920, he was promoted to Senior Superintendent. He became District Superintendent in Peshawar in 1921. In 1922, Handyside was named as Officiating Commandant, N.W.F.P. and was confirmed in that post in 1924.

In 1911, Handyside was awarded the King's Police Medal for his part in capturing a gang of escaped convicts. He was awarded a Bar to his King's Police Medal in 1918. He was ‘mentioned in despatches’ for distinguished service in support of the military operations during the Waziristan Revolt in 1919–20. In 1921, Handyside was honoured by appointment as an Officer of the Order of the British Empire (O.B.E.) "for services during the operations against Afghanistan". In 1923, he was appointed Commander of the Indian Empire (C.I.E.). 

Handyside was killed in action in Mathra, near Peshawar, during a routine operation to arrest two outlaws in 1926. In a tribute paid to him in the British House of Commons, the Earl Winterton, Under-Secretary of State for India, noted that "During 14 years' service on the frontier he established a reputation for personal bravery, tenacity and chivalry that has rarely been equalled."

Bibliography
 Coatman, J. Eric Charles Handyside, C.I.E., O.B.E., Indian Police. Tunbridge Wells, c. 1962.

References

Indian police officers killed in the line of duty
1881 births
1926 deaths